Moreau River is a stream in Cole County in the U.S. state of Missouri. It is a tributary of the Missouri River.

The stream headwaters occur at the confluence of North Moreau Creek with South Moreau Creek at  about ten miles southwest of Jefferson City. At Jefferson City, the river has a mean annual discharge of 416 cu/ft. per sec.

The Moreau River most likely was named for its dark water, "Moreau" being a word derived from the French meaning "black".

See also
List of rivers of Missouri

References

Rivers of Cole County, Missouri
Rivers of Missouri